Admiral Farajollah Rasai (1908 – 2 December 2002) was the Commander of the Imperial Iranian Navy from 1961 to 1972 and the most senior naval commander of the Iranian Navy. He joined the Navy in 1929 and was trained at Naval Academy of Livorno. Under his command, the Iranian Navy took control over the Abu Musa  and the Greater and Lesser Tunbs islands 30 November 1971 from the Emirate of Sharjah. After he retired in 1972, he was an Iranian Senator until the Islamic Revolution when he fled Iran and lived in the United States until his death in 2002.

Dates of rank

Decorations and awards

References 

Commanders of Imperial Iranian Navy
1910 births
2002 deaths
Exiles of the Iranian Revolution in the United States
Members of the Senate of Iran
Iranian emigrants to the United States
Imperial Iranian Navy four-star admirals
20th-century Iranian people
People from Bandar-e Anzali